Pomacentrus is a genus of marine damselfish in the family Pomacentridae. These fish inhabit tropical locations and are often captured or bred as aquarium fish.

Species

There are currently 76 recognized species in this genus:

See also
Damselfish

References

 
Pomacentrinae
Marine fish genera
Taxa named by Bernard Germain de Lacépède